Two ships of the Royal Navy have borne the name HMS Mary James:

  was a ship purchased in 1512 and listed until 1529.
  was a ship captured in 1545 and listed until 1546.

See also
 
 

Royal Navy ship names